The Filmfare Best Actress Award is given by the Filmfare magazine as part of its annual Filmfare Awards South for Tamil (Kollywood) films. The awards were extended to  "Best Actress" in 1972. The year indicates the year of release of the film.

Superlatives 

 Actresses Sujatha won the most awards in the 1970s with three. Saritha and Raadhika won the award two times in the 80s, and Revathi won three times in the 1990s for the most in that decade.  Laila had two wins in the 2000s, while Nayanthara has won the most in the 2010s with three wins.
 Shobha , Archana and Priyamani have won Filmfare award for Best Actress Tamil and National Film Award for Best Actress for their performances in Pasi (1979), Veedu (1988) and Paruthiveeran (2006) respectively.
 Jyothika and Trisha are the  two actress to win both Filmfare Award for Best Actress – Tamil and Filmfare Critics Award for Best Actress.
 Raadhika, Simran Bagga and Jyothika have won awards in 2 different categories other than this category. Raadhika won the Filmfare Lifetime Achievement Award in 2014 and the Filmfare Best Supporting Actress Award in 2015. Simran has won both Debut award in 1997 and Best Supporting Actress Award in 2008, while jyothika won Debut award in 1999 and Filmfare Critics Award for Best Actress – South in 2015.
 Jayalalithaa, Revathi and Samantha Ruth Prabhu are the only three actresses to win both Filmfare Award for Best Actress – Tamil and Filmfare Award for Best Actress – Telugu in the same year for their performances in the year 1972, 1992 and 2012 respectively. Lakshmi and Poornima Bhagyaraj won Filmfare Award for Best Actress – Tamil and Filmfare Award for Best Actress – Malayalam for their performances in the same year(1974 and 1982 respectively).
 Seven actresses have won for their debut Tamil films, in chronological order Manisha Koirala (1995), Shruti (1996), Sandhya (2004), Bhavana (2006), Parvathy Thiruvothu (2008), Malavika Nair (2014) and Ritika Singh (2016).

Multiple nominations 
 15 nominations: Jyothika
 09 nominations: Revathi
 8 nominations: Nayanthara, Raadhika Sarathkumar
 7 nominations: Khusbhu, Lakshmi, Sridevi, Saritha
 6 nominations: Asin,  Meena, Sneha, Sujatha

Winners

Nominations 
Various Nominess and Winner, from 1970–present according to their Movie and Character name.

1970s 
 1972 – Jayalalithaa for Pattikada Pattanama as Kalpana
 1973 – Jayalalithaa for Suryagandhi as Radha
 1974 – Lakshmi for Dikkatra Parvathi as Parvathi
 Sujatha – Aval Oru Thodar Kathai as Kavitha
 Sumithra – Avalum Penn Thaane as Sita
 1975 – Sujatha for Uravu Nalla Uravu 
 K. R. Vijaya – Aayirathil Oruthi as Janaki
 Srividya – Apoorva Raagangal as Bhairavi
 1976 – Sujatha for Annakili as Annakili Aalam – Manmadha Leelai as Rekha
 Jayalalithaa – Chitra Pournami as Rani
 Rani Chandra – Bhadrakali
 Sridevi – Moondru Mudichu as Selvi
 1977 – Sujatha for Avargal as Annakili Lakshmi – Sila Nerangalil Sila Manithargal as Ganga
 Sridevi – 16 Vayathinile as Mayil
 Sripriya – Aattukara Alamelu as Alamelu
 Sumithra – Bhuvana Oru Kelvi Kuri as Bhuvana
 1978 – Latha for Vattathukkul Chaduram as Anu Lakshmi – Oru Nadigai Natakam Parkiral as Kalyani
 Raadhika – Kizhakke Pogum Rail as Panchali
 Sridevi – Sigappu Rojakkal as Sharada
 Sripriya – Aval Appadithan as Manju
 1979 – Shoba for Pasi as Kuppamma Ashwini – Uthiripookkal as Lakshmi
 Jaya Prada – Ninaithale Inikkum as Sona
 Sridevi – Pagalil Oru Iravu as Bindhu
 Sripriya – Neeya? as Naga Rani

 1980s 
 1980 – Saritha for Vandichakkaram as Vadivu Lakshmi – Avan Aval Adhu
 Sridevi – Varumayin Niram Sigappu as Devi
 Sripriya – Avan Aval Adhu
 Suhasini – Nenjathai Killathe as Viji
 1981 – Sridevi for Meendum Kokila as Kokila Ambika – Andha 7 Naatkal as Vasanthi
 Radha – Alaigal Oivathillai as Mary
 Saritha – Mouna Geethangal as Suguna
 Saritha – Thanneer Thanneer as Sevanthi
 Suhasini – Palaivana Solai as Geetha
 1982 – Poornima Bhagyaraj for Payanangal Mudivathillai as Radha Saritha – Agni Sakshi as Kannamma
 Sridevi – Moondram Pirai as Bhagyalakshmi/Viji
 Sripriya – Vazhve Mayam as Radha
 Suhasini – Gopurangal Saivathillai as Arukkani
 1983 – Laskhmi for Unmaigal  Revathi – Mann Vasanai as Muthupechi
 Saritha – Malaiyoor Mambattiyan as Kannaathaa
 Sujatha – Sumangali as Thulasi Vedarathnam
 Urvashi – Mundhanai Mudichu as Parimala
 1984 – Saritha for Achamillai Achamillai as Thenmozhi Lakshmi – Sirai as Bhagirathi
 Nalini – Nooravathu Naal as Devi
 Revathi – Pudhumai Penn as Seetha
 Sujatha – Alaya Deepam
 1985 – Radha for Muthal Mariyathai as Kuyil Kalpana – Chinna Veedu as Bhagyalakshmi
 Nadhiya – Poove Poochooda Vaa as Sundari
 Revathi – Kanni Rasi as Dhanalakshmi
 Saritha – Kalyana Agathigal as Ammulu
 Suhasini – Sindhu Bhairavi as Sindhu
 1986 – Raadhika for Dharma Devathai as Jhansi Rani Amala – Mythili Ennai Kaathali as Mythili
 Lakshmi – Samsaram Adhu Minsaram as Uma
 Nadhiya – Nilave Malare as Janaki / Sheela
 Radha – Amman Kovil Kizhakale as Kanmani
 Revathi – Mouna Ragam as Divya
 1987 – Raadhika for Neethikku Thandanai
 Amala – Vedham Pudhithu as Vaidehi
 Archana – Rettai Vaal Kuruvi as Tulasi
 Nadhiya – Anbulla Appa as Radha
 Radha – Enga Chinna Rasa as Rukmini
 1988 – Archana for Veedu as Sudha
 Raadhika – Poonthotta Kaavalkaaran as Sivagami
 Saritha – Poo Potha Nandavanam
 Shobana – Idhu Namma Aalu as Banu
 Suhasini – En Bommukutty Ammavukku as Lakshmi
 1989 – Bhanupriya for Aararo Aariraro as Meenakshi Raadhika – Thendral Sudum as Raadhika
 Geetha – Pudhu Pudhu Arthangal as Gowri
 Kanaka – Karakattakkaran as Kamakshi
 Seetha – Pudhea Paadhai as sita

 1990s 
 1990 – Raadhika for Keladi Kanmani as Sharada Gautami – Namma Ooru Poovatha as Poovatha
 Revathi – Anjali as Chitra
 Revathi – Kizhakku Vaasal as Thaayamma
 Urvashi – Michael Madana Kama Rajan as Thiripurasundari
 1991 – Gautami for Nee Pathi Naan Pathi as Nivedha Bhanupriya – AzhaganAzhagan as Priya Ranjan
 Heera – Idhayam as Geetha
 Jayabharathi – MarupakkamMarupakkam as Janaki
 Khushbu – Chinna Thambi as Nandhini
 1992 – Revathi for Thevar Magan as Panchavarnam Khushbu – Rickshaw Mama as Bhuvana
 Madhoo – Roja as Roja
 Sukanya – Chinna Gounder as Deivaanai
 Vijayashanti – Mannan as Shanthi Devi
 1993 – Revathi for Marupadiyum as Thulasi Bhanupriya – GokulamGokulam as Mary/Gayathri
 Khushbu – Jaathi Malli as Sriranjini
 Meena – Yajaman as Vaitheeswari Vaanavarayan
 Priya Raman – Valli as Valli
 Raadhika – Kizhakku Cheemayile as Virumaayi
 1994 – Revathi for Priyanka as Priyanka Khushbu – NattamaiNattamai as Lakshmi
 Nagma – KadhalanKadhalan as Shruthi
 Rajashree – KaruthammaKaruthamma as Karuthamma
 Sukanya – Mahanadhi as Yamuna
 Urvashi – Magalir Mattum as Janaki
 1995 – Manisha Koirala for Bombay as Shaila banu Kalpana – Sathi Leelavathi as Leelavathi
 Khushbu – Kolangal as Ganga
 Meena – Muthu as Ranganayagi
 Raadhika – PasumponPasumpon as Nachiyar
 Suvaluxmi – AasaiAasai as saraswathi
 1996 – Shruti for Kalki as Kalki Devayani – Kadhal Kottai as Kamali
 Meena – Avvai Shanmugi as Janaki
 Sangita – Poove Unakkaga as Priyadarshini
 Suvaluxmi – Gokulathil Seethai as Nila
 Urvashi – Irattai Roja as Uma
 1997 – Meena for Bharathi Kannamma as Kannamma Devayani – Surya Vamsam as Nandhini
 Khushbu – Paththini
 Meena – PorkkaalamPorkkaalam as Maragadham
 Shalini – Kadhalukku Mariyadhai as Mini
 1998 – Kausalya for Pooveli as Mahalakshmi Khushbu – Simmarasi as Sivagami Jayanthi
 Rambha – Ninaithen Vandhai as Swapna Gokula Krishnan
 Revathi – ThalaimuraiThalaimurai as Nachiyar
 Roja – Unnidathil Ennai Koduthen as Radha
 1999 – Ramya Krishnan for Padayappa as Neelambari Abitha – Sethu as Abitha Kujalambal
 Devayani – Nee Varuvai Ena as Nandhini
 Jyothika – Poovellam Kettuppar as Janaki Kannan / Kalyani
 Vindhya – Sangamam as Abhirami

 2000s 
 2000 – Jyothika for Kushi as Jennifer Devayani – Bharathi as Chellamal Bharathi
 Meena – Rhythm as Chitra
 Shalini – Alaipayuthey as Sakthi
 2001 – Laila for Nandha as Kalyani Devayani – Aanandham as Bharathi
 Jyothika – Poovellam Un Vasam as Chella
 Soundarya – Thavasi as Priyadarshini
 2002 – Simran for Kannathil Muthamittal as Indira Nandita Das – Azhagi as Dhanalakshmi aka Dhanam
 Soundarya – Ivan as Dikshanya
 Sneha – April Madhathil as Shwetha
 2003 – Laila for Pithamagan as Manju Jyothika – Dhool as Eswari / Mundakkanneeswari
 Jyothika – Kaakha Kaakha as Maya Anpbuselvan
 Sneha  – Parthiban Kanavu  as Sathya and Janani
 2004 – Sandhya for Kadhal as Aishwarya
 Jyothika – Manmadhan as Mythili
 Jyothika – Perazhagan as Priya / Shenbagam
 Reema Sen – Chellamae as Mythili
 2005 – Asin for Ghajini as Kalpana Asin for Majaa as Seetha Lakshmi
 Jyothika for Chandramukhi as Ganga Senthilnathan
 Meera Jasmine for Kasthuri Maan as Umashankari Vetrivel
 Sadha for Anniyan as Nandhini
 2006 – Bhavana for  Chithiram Pesudhadi as Charu Jyothika for Sillunu Oru Kaadhal as Kundavi Gowtham
 Jyothika for Vettaiyaadu Vilaiyaadu as Aaradhana
 Sandhya for Dishyum as Sindhya
 Sneha for Pudhupettai as Krishnaveni
 2007 – Priyamani for Paruthiveeran as Muththazhagu
 Archana – Onbadhu Roobai Nottu as Velayi
 Asin Thottumkal – Pokkiri as Shruthi
 Jyothika – Mozhi as Archana
 Nayantara – Billa as Sasha
 Tamannaah – Kalloori as Shobana
 2008 – Parvathy Thiruvothu for Poo as Maari
 Asin Thottumkal – Dasavathaaram as Andal
 Genelia D'Souza – Santosh Subramaniam as Hasini
 Nayanthara – Yaaradi Nee Mohini as Keerthi
 Sneha – Pirivom Santhippom as Visalatchi
 Swathi – Subramaniyapuram as Thulasi
 Trisha Krishnan – Abhiyum Naanum as Abi
 2009 Pooja Umashankar – Naan Kadavul as Hamshavalli
 Padmapriya Janakiraman – Pokkisham as Nadhira
 Sneha – Achamundu Achamundu as Malini Kumar
 Sriya Reddy – Kanchivaram as Annam
 Tamannaah – Kandein Kadhalai as Anjali

2010s 
 2010 Anjali – Angadi Theru as Sermakkani
 Amala Paul – Mynaa as Mynaa
 Nayanthara – Boss Engira Bhaskaran as Chandrika Shanmugasundaram
 Reema Sen – Aayirathil Oruvan as Anitha Pandiyan
 Tamannaah – Paiyya as Charulatha
 Trisha Krishnan – Vinnaithaandi Varuvaayaa as Jessy
 2011 Anjali – Engaeyum Eppothum as Manimegalai Ramasamy
 Anushka Shetty – Deiva Thirumagal as Anuradha Ragunathan
 Asin Thottumkal – Kaavalan as Meera
 Iniya – Vaagai Sooda Vaa as Madhi
 Richa Gangopadhyay – Mayakkam Enna as Yamini
 Shruti Haasan – 7aum Arivu as Subha
 2012 Samantha Ruth Prabhu – Neethane En Ponvasantham as Nithya Vasudevan
 Amala Paul – Kadhalil Sodhappuvadhu Yeppadi as Parvathi
 Lakshmi Menon – Kumki as Alli
 Shruti Haasan – 3 as Janani
 Sunaina – Neerparavai as Esther
 2013 Nayanthara – Raja Rani as Regina John
 Parvathy – Maryan as Panimalar
 Pooja – Vidiyum Munn as Rekha
 Sneha – Haridas as Amudhavalli
 Trisha Krishnan – Endrendrum Punnagai as Priya
 Vedhicka – Paradesi as Angamma
 2014 Malavika Nair – Cuckoo as Sudhanthirakodi
 Amala Paul – Velaiyilla Pattathari as Shalini
 Catherine Tresa – Madras as Kalaiarasi
 Samantha Ruth Prabhu – Kaththi as Ankitha
 Vedhicka – Kaaviya Thalaivan as Vadivambal
 2015 Nayanthara – Naanum Rowdy Dhaan as Kadhambari
 Aishwarya Rajesh – Kaaka Muttai as mother
 Gautami – Papanasam as Rani Suyambulingam
 Jyothika – 36 Vayadhinile as Vasanthi Tamizhselvan
 Nithya Menen – OK Kanmani as Tara Kalingarayar
 2016 Ritika Singh – Irudhi Suttru as Ezhil Madhi
 Nayanthara – Iru Mugan as Meera George
 Samantha Ruth Prabhu – 24 as Sathya
 Samantha Ruth Prabhu – Theri as Mithra Vijaykumar
 Tamannaah – Devi as Devi
 Trisha Krishnan – Kodi as Rudhra
 2017 Nayanthara – Aramm as Madhivadhani IAS
 Aditi Balan – Aruvi as Aruvi
 Amala Paul – Thiruttu Payale 2 as Agalya Selvam
 Andrea Jeremiah – Taramani as Althea Johnson
 Jyothika – Magalir Mattum as Prabhavathi
 Revathi – Power Paandi as Poothendral
 2018 Trisha – 96 as Janaki Devi
 Aishwarya Rajesh – Kanaa as Kousalya Murugesan
 Jyothika – Kaatrin Mozhi as Vijayalakshmi Balakrishnan
 Nayanthara – Kolamavu Kokila as Kokila
 Sai Pallavi – Maari 2 as Anandhi

2020's 
 2020–2021 Lijomol Jose – Jai Bhim as Sengeni Rajakannu
 Aishwarya Rajesh – Ka Pae Ranasingam as Ariyanachi Ranasingam
 Aparna Balamurali – Soorarai Pottru as Sundari "Bommi" Nedumaaran
 Dushara Vijaran – Sarpatta Parambarai as Mariyamma Kabilan
 Jyothika – Ponmagal Vandhal as Venba / Angel / Sakthijothi (imagination)
 Jyothika – Udanpirappe as Maathangi Sargunam

Notes

References 
 
 
 

Actress
Film awards for lead actress